The 2016–17 Oklahoma City Thunder season was the 9th season of the franchise in Oklahoma City and the 51st in the National Basketball Association (NBA). On the April 9, Russell Westbrook broke the record of Oscar Robertson of most triple-doubles in a season with 42. Westbrook would go on to be named the League's MVP in June.

The Thunder would finish the regular season with a 47–35 record, securing the 6th seed. In the playoffs, they faced off against the Houston Rockets in the First Round, in which they lost in five games.

This was the Thunder's first season since 2006–07 without Kevin Durant, as he left the Thunder and signed with the Golden State Warriors.

Previous season
The Thunder finished the 2015–16 season 55–27 to finish in first place in the Northwest Division, third in the Western Conference and qualified for the playoffs. Last season featured the Thunder making their fourth conference finals appearance since relocating to Oklahoma City before falling to the Golden State Warriors after leading the series 3-1.

Offseason

Draft picks

The Thunder did not own their first-round pick or second-round pick entering the draft. The Thunder had their 2016 first-round pick conveyed to the Philadelphia 76ers after being originally acquired by the Cleveland Cavaliers in the Dion Waiters trade back in 2015. The Thunder had their 2015 first-round pick protected top 18 however did not convey as the Thunder ended up with the 14th pick. The protections became protected top 15 which rolled over to the Thunder's 2016 first-round pick, ending up as 26th overall. The Thunder also traded their 2016 second-round pick in the Randy Foye trade with the Denver Nuggets in 2016.

On draft night, the Thunder traded Serge Ibaka to the Orlando Magic in exchange for Victor Oladipo, Ersan Ilyasova and the draft rights to Domantas Sabonis, the eleventh pick. The Thunder also traded for the draft rights to Daniel Hamilton, the fifty-sixth pick, from the Denver Nuggets in exchange for cash considerations.

The Thunder ended 2016 NBA Draft night with Gonzaga forward Domantas Sabonis, UConn guard Daniel Hamilton as well as Victor Oladipo and Ersan Ilyasova.

Trades

On June 23, the Thunder traded Serge Ibaka to the Orlando Magic in exchange for Victor Oladipo, Ersan Ilyasova, and the draft rights to Domantas Sabonis, the eleventh pick. Ibaka was set to hit unrestricted free agency following the 2016-17 season and was becoming unsatisfied with his role on the team, particularly his touches on offense. With the growing sentiment that Ibaka would look for another team in free agency as well as Kevin Durant's upcoming free agency, the Thunder decided to gamble to strengthen their position to keep Durant.  Oladipo came to the Thunder as the second overall pick of the 2013 NBA Draft with career averages of 15.9 points, 4.4 rebounds, 4.0 assists and 1.6 steals during his three year stint with the Orlando Magic that saw an All-Rookie First Team selection in 2014. The same day, the Thunder traded cash considerations to the Denver Nuggets in exchange for Daniel Hamilton, the fifty-sixth pick.

On August 30, the Thunder traded two 2017 second-round picks to the Denver Nuggets in exchange for Joffrey Lauvergne.

Free agency
For this offseason, free agency began on July 1st, 2016 while the July moratorium ended on July 6. Kevin Durant, Randy Foye, Nazr Mohammed and Dion Waiters were set to hit unrestricted free agency. On July 4, it was reported that Kevin Durant agreed to a two-year, $54.3 million deal with the Golden State Warriors, which he later signed on July 7. Prior to his decision, Durant met with the Oklahoma City Thunder, Golden State Warriors, San Antonio Spurs, Boston Celtics, Miami Heat and the LA Clippers. Durant announced his decision to leave the Thunder on The Players' Tribune citing "by far the most challenging few weeks in my professional life." Durant spent all nine seasons with the Thunder organization, one year in Seattle. Durant joined the Warriors as a seven-time All Star, All-NBA First Team honors five times, All-NBA Second Team honors once and named the NBA Most Valuable Player award in 2014. Coming off an injury-riddled 2014-15 season, Durant's final act with the Thunder came off a 55-27 record, defeating the 67-win San Antonio Spurs and nearly defeating the record setting 73-9 Golden State Warriors after leading 3-1 to lose in seven games.

After Durant announced his intentions to sign with the Warriors, Thunder owner Clay Bennett and Thunder general manager Sam Presti released statements commemorating Durant.

Durant's move to the Warriors was received negatively who viewed his exit as "the easy way out" to winning a championship. The decision was commonly compared to LeBron James joining the Miami Heat back in 2011.

On July 15, Randy Foye signed a deal with the Brooklyn Nets. On July 26, Dion Waiters signed a deal with the Miami Heat after he became an unrestricted free agent. After the signing of Alex Abrines, the Thunder rescinded Waiters' qualifying offer in order to prioritize flexibility.

On July 23, Alex Abrines signed a rookie deal with the Thunder. Abrines was originally selected 32nd overall in the 2013 NBA Draft but did not sign a contract in the 2013-14 season, instead playing three seasons with FC Barcelona. On August 11, it was reported that Ronnie Price agreed to a two-year, $5 million deal with the Thunder, which he later signed on August 14. On August 20, Semaj Christon signed a rookie deal with the Thunder. Christon was originally selected 55th overall in the 2014 NBA Draft but did not sign a contract in the 2014-15 season, instead playing two seasons with the Oklahoma City Blue. With the emergence of Christon, the Thunder decided to waive Price's guaranteed contract along with Mitch McGary to finalize the regular season roster. McGary was suspended for a total of 15 games to start the season due to a drug violation. Originally picked 21st overall in the 2014 NBA Draft, McGary suffered an injury-riddled second season with the Thunder after a promising rookie year.

After Durant's departure, Westbrook's future with the Thunder was speculated with trade rumors. However on August 4, Russell Westbrook agreed to a renegotiation-and-extension of his contract worth $85.7 million. 

On October 31, the Thunder re-signed Steven Adams and Victor Oladipo to multi-year contract extensions. Playing on their last year of their rookie contracts, both Adams and Oladipo were selected in the 2013 NBA Draft. Andre Roberson, who was also in the draft, did not reach a deal with the Thunder. Oladipo agreed to a four-year, $84 million deal while Adams agreed to a four-year, $100 million deal.

Front office and coaching changes
On June 1, Billy Donovan announced associate head coach Monty Williams would not return to the Thunder for the 2016-17 season. Williams did not return to the Thunder during the 2015-16 season following the death of his wife, Ingrid.  

On July 1, the Thunder announced Adrian Griffin, Vin Bhavnani and Royal Ivey as assistant coaches. Griffin joins the Thunder after serving as an sssitant coach with the Orlando Magic. Bhavnani joins the coaching staff after serving as the manager of advanced scouting/player development for the Thunder. Ivey joins the coaching staff after serving as a player development assistant for the Thunder.

Roster

Roster notes
 Kyle Singler changed his jersey number to #15 while Victor Oladipo chose Singler's former jersey number #5.

Standings

Conference

Division

Game log

Preseason

|- style="background:#fcc;"
| 1
| October 3
|@ Real Madrid
| 
| Victor Oladipo (34)
| Enes Kanter (10)
| Victor Oladipo (5)
| Barclaycard Center (Madrid)12,414
| 0–1
|- style="background:#cfc;"
| 2
| October 5
|@ FC Barcelona
| 
| Enes Kanter (24)
| Enes Kanter (8)
| Russell Westbrook (5)
| Palau Sant Jordi (Barcelona)16,236
| 1–1
|- style="background:#fcc;"
| 3
| October 11
|@ Dallas
| 
| Ersan İlyasova (19)
| Enes Kanter (13)
| Russell Westbrook (7)
| American Airlines Center18,239
|1–2
|- style="background:#fcc;"
| 4
| October 13
| Memphis
| 
| Álex Abrines (19)
| Kaleb Tarczewski (10)
| Russell Westbrook (4)
| BOK Center (Tulsa)17,022
| 1–3
|- style="background:#cfc;"
| 5
| October 16
| Minnesota
| 
| Russell Westbrook (26)
| Steven Adams (11)
| Russell Westbrook (10)
| Chesapeake Energy ArenaN/A
| 2–3
|- style="background:#cfc;"
| 6
| October 18
| Denver
| 
| Steven Adams (17)
| Steven Adams (9)
| Russell Westbrook (9)
| Chesapeake Energy ArenaN/A
| 3–3

Regular season

|- style="background:#cfc;"
| 1
| October 26
| @ Philadelphia
|  
| Russell Westbrook (32)
| Russell Westbrook (12)
| Russell Westbrook (9)
| Wells Fargo Center  9,420
| 1–0
|-style="background:#cfc;"
| 2
| October 28
| Phoenix
| 
| Russell Westbrook (51)
| Russell Westbrook (13)
| Russell Westbrook (10)
| Chesapeake Energy Arena  18,203
| 2–0
|-style="background:#cfc;"
| 3
| October 30
| L. A. Lakers
| 
| Russell Westbrook (33)
| Russell Westbrook (12)
| Russell Westbrook (16)
| Chesapeake Energy Arena 18,203
| 3–0

|- style="background:#cfc;"
| 4
| November 2
| @ L. A. Clippers
|  
| Russell Westbrook (35)
| Enes Kanter (12)
| Russell Westbrook (5)
| Staples Center 19,060
| 4–0
|- style="background:#fcc;"
| 5
| November 3
| @ Golden State
|  
| Victor Oladipo (21)
| Joffrey Lauvergne (7)
| Russell Westbrook (10)
| Oracle Arena19,596
| 4–1
|- style="background:#cfc;"
| 6
| November 5
| Minnesota
| 
| Russell Westbrook (28)
| Enes Kanter (10)
| Russell Westbrook (8)
| Chesapeake Energy Arena18,203
| 5–1
|- style="background:#cfc;"
| 7
| November 7
| Miami
| 
| Enes Kanter (24)
| Kanter & Sabonis (10)
| Russell Westbrook (11)
| Chesapeake Energy Arena 18,203
| 6–1
|- style="background:#fcc;"
| 8
| November 9
| Toronto
| 
| Russell Westbrook (36)
| Steven Adams (12)
| Russell Westbrook (7)
| Chesapeake Energy Arena18,203
| 6–2
|- style="background:#fcc;"
| 9
| November 11
|  L. A. Clippers
|  
| Russell Westbrook (29)
| Russell Westbrook (14)
| Russell Westbrook (9)
| Chesapeake Energy Arena18,203
| 6–3
|- style="background:#fcc;"
| 10
| November 13
| Orlando
|  
| Russell Westbrook (41)
| Russell Westbrook (12)
| Russell Westbrook (16)
| Chesapeake Energy Arena18,203
| 6–4
|- style="background:#fcc;"
| 11
| November 14
| @ Detroit
| 
| Russell Westbrook (33)
| Russell Westbrook (15)
| Russell Westbrook (8)
| Palace of Auburn Hills 14,172
| 6–5
|- style="background:#cfc;"
| 12
| November 16
| Houston
| 
| Russell Westbrook (30)
| Victor Oladipo (10)
| Russell Westbrook (9)
| Chesapeake Energy Arena18,203
| 7–5
|- style="background:#cfc;"
| 13
| November 18
| Brooklyn
| 
| Russell Westbrook (30)
| Russell Westbrook (11)
| Russell Westbrook (13)
| Chesapeake Energy Arena18,203
| 8–5
|- style="background:#fcc;"
| 14
| November 20
| Indiana
| 
| Russell Westbrook (31)
| Russell Westbrook (11)
| Russell Westbrook (15)
| Chesapeake Energy Arena18,203
| 8–6
|- style="background:#fcc;"
| 15
| November 22
| @ L. A. Lakers
| 
| Russell Westbrook (34)
| Russell Westbrook (8)
| Russell Westbrook (13)
| Staples Center18,997
| 8–7
|- style="background:#fcc;"
| 16
| November 23
| @ Sacramento
|  
| Russell Westbrook (31)
| Russell Westbrook (11)
| Russell Westbrook (9)
| Golden 1 Center 17,608
| 8–8
|- style="background:#cfc;"
| 17
| November 25
| @ Denver
|  
| Russell Westbrook (36)
| Russell Westbrook (12)
| Russell Westbrook (18)
| Pepsi Center 14,327
| 9–8
|- style="background:#cfc;"
| 18
| November 26
| Detroit
|  
| Anthony Morrow (21)
| Russell Westbrook (13)
| Russell Westbrook (15)
| Chesapeake Energy Arena 18,203
| 10–8
|- style="background:#cfc;"
| 19
| November 28
| @New York
|  
| Russell Westbrook (27)
| Russell Westbrook (18)
| Russell Westbrook (14)
| Madison Square Garden 19,812
| 11–8
|- style="background:#cfc;"
| 20
| November 30
| Washington
|  
| Russell Westbrook (35)
| Russell Westbrook (14)
| Russell Westbrook (11)
| Chesapeake Energy Arena 18,203
| 12–8

|- style="background:#cfc;"
| 21
| December 4
|  New Orleans
| 
| Russell Westbrook (28)
| Russell Westbrook (17)
| Russell Westbrook (12)
| Chesapeake Energy Arena18,203
| 13–8
|- style="background:#cfc;"
| 22
| December 5
| @ Atlanta
| 
| Russell Westbrook (32)
| Russell Westbrook (13)
| Russell Westbrook (12)
| Philips Arena 14,654
| 14–8
|- style="background:#fcc;"
| 23
| December 9
| Houston
|  
| Russell Westbrook (27)
| Russell Westbrook (10)
| Russell Westbrook (10)
| Chesapeake Energy Arena 18,203
| 14–9
|- style="background:#cfc;"
| 24
| December 11
| Boston
| 
| Russell Westbrook (37)
| Russell Westbrook (12)
| Russell Westbrook (6)
| Chesapeake Energy Arena18,203
| 15–9
|- style="background:#fcc;"
| 25
| December 13
| @ Portland
| 
| Russell Westbrook (20)
| Domantas Sabonis (9)
| Russell Westbrook (6)
| Moda Center 19,505
| 15–10
|- style="background:#fcc;"
| 26
| December 14
| @ Utah
| 
| Russell Westbrook (25)
| Russell Westbrook (6)
| Russell Westbrook (5)
| Vivint Smart Home Arena 19,911
| 15–11
|- style="background:#cfc;"
| 27
| December 17
| Phoenix
| 
| Russell Westbrook (26)
| Russell Westbrook (11)
| Russell Westbrook (22)
| Chesapeake Energy Arena18,203
| 16–11
|- style="background:#fcc;"
| 28
| December 19
| Atlanta
| 
| Russell Westbrook (46)
| Russell Westbrook (11)
| Russell Westbrook (7)
| Chesapeake Energy Arena 18,203
| 16–12
|- style="background:#cfc;"
| 29
| December 21
| @ New Orleans
|  
| Russell Westbrook (42)
| Enes Kanter (14)
| Russell Westbrook (7)
| Smoothie King Center 16,375
| 17–12
|- style="background:#cfc;"
| 30
| December 23
| @ Boston
|  
| Russell Westbrook (45)
| Russell Westbrook (11)
| Russell Westbrook (11)
| TD Garden18,624
| 18–12
|- style="background:#cfc;"
| 31
| December 25
| Minnesota
| 
| Russell Westbrook (31)
| Westbrook, Sabonis (7)
| Russell Westbrook (15)
| Chesapeake Energy Arena 18,203
| 19–12
|- style="background:#cfc;"
| 32
| December 27
| @ Miami
| 
| Russell Westbrook (29)
| Russell Westbrook (17)
| Russell Westbrook (11)
| American Airlines Arena 19,977
| 20–12
|- style="background:#fcc;"
| 33
| December 29
| @ Memphis
| 
| Russell Westbrook (21)
| Steven Adams (15)
| Semaj Christon (4)
| FedEx Forum18,119
| 20–13
|- style="background:#cfc;"
| 34
| December 31
| L. A. Clippers
| 
| Enes Kanter (23)
| Russell Westbrook (12)
| Russell Westbrook (14)
| Chesapeake Energy Arena18,203
| 21–13

|- style="background:#fcc;"
| 35
| January 2
| @ Milwaukee
| 
| Russell Westbrook (30)
| Steven Adams (8)
| Russell Westbrook (6)
| BMO Harris Bradley Center 17,423
| 21–14
|- style="background:#fcc;"
| 36
| January 4
| @ Charlotte
| 
| Russell Westbrook (33)
| Russell Westbrook (15)
| Russell Westbrook (8)
| Time Warner Cable Arena 18,418
| 21–15
|- style="background:#fcc;"
| 37
| January 5
| @ Houston
| 
| Russell Westbrook (49)
| Enes Kanter (13)
| Russell Westbrook (5)
| Toyota Center 18,055
| 21–16
|- style="background:#cfc;"
| 38
| January 7
| Denver
| 
| Russell Westbrook (32)
| Russell Westbrook (17)
| Russell Westbrook (11)
| Chesapeake Energy Arena18,203
| 22–16
|- style="background:#cfc;"
| 39
| January 9
| @ Chicago
| 
| Steven Adams (22)
| Enes Kanter (11)
| Russell Westbrook (14)
| United Center21,923
| 23–16
|- style="background:#cfc;"
| 40
| January 11
| Memphis
| 
| Russell Westbrook (24)
| Kanter, Westbrook (13)
| Russell Westbrook (12)
| Chesapeake Energy Arena 16,236
| 24–16
|- style="background:#fcc;"
| 41
| January 13
| @ Minnesota
| 
| Kanter, Westbrook (21)
| Russell Westbrook (12)
| Russell Westbrook (11)
| Target Center16,644
| 24–17
|- style="background:#cfc;"
| 42
| January 15
| @ Sacramento
| 
| Russell Westbrook (36)
| Enes Kanter (12)
| Russell Westbrook (10)
| Golden 1 Center 17,608
| 25–17
|- style="background:#fcc;"
| 43
| January 16
| @ L.A. Clippers
| 
| Russell Westbrook (24)
| Joffrey Lauvergne (9)
| Westbrook, Sabonis (4)
| Staples Center 19,060
| 25–18
|- style="background:#fcc;"
| 44
| January 18
| @ Golden State
| 
| Russell Westbrook (27)
| Russell Westbrook (15)
| Russell Westbrook (13)
| Oracle Arena 19,596
| 25–19
|- style="background:#cfc;"
| 45
| January 23
| @ Utah
| 
| Russell Westbrook (38)
| Andre Roberson (11)
| Russell Westbrook (10)
| Vivint Smart Home Arena 19,911
| 26–19
|- style="background:#cfc;"
| 46
| January 25
| @ New Orleans
| 
| Russell Westbrook (27)
| Russell Westbrook (12)
| Russell Westbrook (10)
| Smoothie King Center 15,277
| 27–19
|- style="background:#cfc;"
| 47
| January 26
| Dallas
| 
| Russell Westbrook (45)
| Westbrook, Roberson (8)
| Westbrook, Oladipo (3)
| Chesapeake Energy Arena 18,203
| 28–19
|-style="background:#fcc;"
|48
|January 29
|@ Cleveland
|
| Russell Westbrook (20)
| Russell Westbrook (12)
| Russell Westbrook (10)
| Quicken Loans Arena  20,562
| 28–20
|-style="background:#fcc;"
|49
|January 31
| @ San Antonio
| 
| Russell Westbrook (27)
| Steven Adams (12)
| Russell Westbrook (14)
| AT&T Center 18,418
| 28–21

|- style="background:#fcc;"
| 50
| February 1
|  Chicago
| 
| Russell Westbrook (28)
| Adams, Roberson (8)
| Russell Westbrook (8)
| Chesapeake Energy Arena18,203
| 28–22
|- style="background:#cfc;"
| 51
| February 3
| Memphis
|  
| Russell Westbrook (38)
| Adams, Westbrook (13)
| Russell Westbrook (12)
| Chesapeake Energy Arena18,203
| 29–22
|- style="background:#cfc;"
| 52
| February 5
| Portland
| 
| Russell Westbrook (42)
| Adams, Oladipo (13)
| Russell Westbrook (8)
| Chesapeake Energy Arena 18,203
| 30–22
|- style="background:#fcc;"
| 53
| February 6
| @ Indiana
| 
| Russell Westbrook (27)
| Russell Westbrook (18)
| Russell Westbrook (9)
| Bankers Life Fieldhouse16,123
| 30–23
|- style="background:#cfc;"
| 54
| February 9
| Cleveland
| 
| Russell Westbrook (29)
| Steven Adams (13)
| Russell Westbrook (11)
| Chesapeake Energy Arena18,203
| 31–23
|- style="background:#fcc;"
| 55
| February 11
| Golden State
| 
| Russell Westbrook (47)
| Westbrook, Roberson (11)
| Russell Westbrook (8)
| Chesapeake Energy Arena18,203
| 31–24
|- style="background:#fcc;"
| 56
| February 13
| @ Washington
| 
| Lauvergne, Westbrook (17)
| Steven Adams (11)
| Grant, Lauvergne, Westbrook (4)
| Verizon Center20,356
| 31–25
|- style="background:#cfc;"
| 57
| February 15
| New York
| 
| Russell Westbrook (38)
| Russell Westbrook (14)
| Russell Westbrook (12)
| Chesapeake Energy Arena18,203
| 32–25
|- align="center"
|colspan="9" bgcolor="#bbcaff"|All-Star Break
|- style="background:#cfc;"
| 58
| February 24
| L.A. Lakers
| 
| Russell Westbrook (17)
| Russell Westbrook (18)
| Russell Westbrook (17)
| Chesapeake Energy Arena18,203
| 33–25
|- style="background:#cfc;"
| 59
| February 26
| New Orleans
| 
| Russell Westbrook (41)
| Russell Westbrook (11)
| Russell Westbrook (11)
| Chesapeake Energy Arena18,203
| 34–25
|- style="background:#cfc;"
| 60
| February 28
| Utah
| 
| Russell Westbrook (43)
| Russell Westbrook (11)
| Russell Westbrook (10)
| Chesapeake Energy Arena 18,203
| 35–25

|- style="background:#fcc;"
| 61
| March 2
| @ Portland
| 
| Russell Westbrook (45)
| Enes Kanter (10)
| Russell Westbrook (4)
| Moda Center 19,875
| 35–26
|- style="background:#fcc;"
| 62
| March 3
| @ Phoenix
| 
| Russell Westbrook (48)
| Russell Westbrook (17)
| Russell Westbrook (9)
| Talking Stick Resort Arena18,055
| 35–27
|- style="background:#fcc;"
| 63
| March 5
| @ Dallas
| 
| Russell Westbrook (29)
| Enes Kanter (10)
| Russell Westbrook (5)
| American Airlines Center20,232
| 35–28
|- style="background:#fcc;"
| 64
| March 7
| Portland
| 
| Russell Westbrook (58)
| Taj Gibson (8)
| Russell Westbrook (9)
| Chesapeake Energy Arena18,203
| 35–29
|- style="background:#cfc;"
| 65
| March 9
| San Antonio
| 
| Russell Westbrook (23)
| Russell Westbrook (13)
| Russell Westbrook (13)
| Chesapeake Energy Arena18,203
| 36–29
|- style="background:#cfc;"
| 66
| March 11
| Utah
| 
| Russell Westbrook (33)
| Russell Westbrook (11)
| Russell Westbrook (14)
| Chesapeake Energy Arena 18,203
| 37–29
|- style="background:#cfc;"
| 67
| March 14
| @ Brooklyn
|  
| Russell Westbrook (25)
| Russell Westbrook (12)
| Russell Westbrook (19)
| Barclays Center13,911
| 38–29
|- style="background:#cfc;"
| 68
| March 16
| @ Toronto
|  
| Russell Westbrook (24)
| Russell Westbrook (10)
| Russell Westbrook (16)
| Air Canada Centre  19,800
| 39–29
|- style="background:#cfc;"
| 69
| March 18
| Sacramento
| 
| Russell Westbrook (28)
| Steven Adams (13)
| Russell Westbrook (10)
| Chesapeake Energy Arena 18,203
| 40–29
|- style="background:#fcc;"
| 70
| March 20
| Golden State
| 
| Victor Oladipo (17)
| Enes Kanter (10)
| Russell Westbrook (7)
| Chesapeake Energy Arena 18,203
| 40–30
|- style="background:#cfc;"
| 71
| March 22
| Philadelphia
| 
| Enes Kanter (24)
| Enes Kanter, Westbrook (11)
| Russell Westbrook (14)
| Chesapeake Energy Arena18,203
| 41–30
|- style="background:#fcc;"
| 72
| March 26
| @ Houston
| 
| Russell Westbrook (39)
| Russell Westbrook (11)
| Russell Westbrook (13)
| Toyota Center18,055
| 41–31
|- style="background:#cfc;"
| 73
| March 27
| @ Dallas
| 
| Russell Westbrook (37)
| Russell Westbrook (13)
| Russell Westbrook (10)
| American Airlines Center19,970
| 42–31
|- style="background:#cfc;"
| 74
| March 29
| @ Orlando
|  
| Russell Westbrook (57)
| Russell Westbrook (13)
| Russell Westbrook (11)
| Amway Center18,408
| 43–31
|-style="background:#fcc;"
|75
|March 31
| San Antonio
| 
| Russell Westbrook (32)
| Russell Westbrook (15)
| Russell Westbrook (12)
| Chesapeake Energy Arena 18,203
| 43–32

|- style="background:#fcc;"
| 76
| April 2
| Charlotte
| 
| Russell Westbrook (40)
| Russell Westbrook (13)
| Russell Westbrook (10)
| Chesapeake Energy Arena 18,203
| 43–33
|- style="background:#cfc;"
| 77
| April 4
| Milwaukee
| 
| Enes Kanter (17)
| Russell Westbrook (13)
| Russell Westbrook (13)
| Chesapeake Energy Arena 18,203
| 44–33
|- style="background:#cfc;"
| 78
| April 5
| @ Memphis
| 
| Russell Westbrook (45)
| Steven Adams (10)
| Russell Westbrook (10)
| FedEx Forum17,298
| 45–33
|- style="background:#fcc;"
| 79
| April 7
| @ Phoenix
| 
| Russell Westbrook (23)
| Russell Westbrook (12)
| Russell Westbrook (8)
| Talking Stick Resort 18,055
| 45–34
|- style="background:#cfc;"
| 80
| April 9
|  @ Denver
| 
| Russell Westbrook (50)
| Russell Westbrook (16)
| Russell Westbrook (10)
| Pepsi Center 19,718
| 46–34
|- style="background:#cfc;"
| 81
| April 11
| @ Minnesota
| 
| Victor Oladipo (20)
| Oladipo, Sabonis (9)
| Christon, Oladipo (8)
| Target Center19,356
| 47–34
|- style="background:#fcc;"
| 82
| April 12
| Denver
| 
| Grant, Gibson (13)
| Taj Gibson (7)
| Russell Westbrook (8)
| Chesapeake Energy Arena18,203
| 47–35

Playoffs

|- style="background:#fcc;"
| 1
| April 16
| @ Houston
| 
| Russell Westbrook (22)
| Russell Westbrook (11)
| Russell Westbrook (7)
| Toyota Center18,055
| 0–1
|- style="background:#fcc;"
| 2
| April 19
| @ Houston
| 
| Russell Westbrook (51)
| Russell Westbrook (10)
| Russell Westbrook (13)
| Toyota Center18,055
| 0–2
|- style="background:#cfc;"
| 3
| April 21
| Houston
| 
| Russell Westbrook (32)
| Russell Westbrook (13)
| Russell Westbrook (11)
| Chesapeake Energy Arena18,203
| 1–2
|- style="background:#fcc;"
| 4
| April 23
| Houston
| 
| Russell Westbrook (35)
| Russell Westbrook (14)
| Russell Westbrook (14)
| Chesapeake Energy Arena18,203
| 1–3
|- style="background:#fcc;"
| 5
| April 25
| @ Houston
| 
| Russell Westbrook (47)
| Russell Westbrook (11)
| Russell Westbrook (9)
| Toyota Center18,055
| 1–4

Player statistics

Regular season

 Led team in statistic
After all games.
‡ Waived during the season
† Traded during the season
≠ Acquired during the season

Playoffs

 Led team in statistic
After all games.

Individual game highs

Awards and records

Awards

Transactions

Overview

Trades

Free agency

Re-signed

Additions

Subtractions

References

Oklahoma City Thunder seasons
Oklahoma City Thunder
2016 in sports in Oklahoma
2017 in sports in Oklahoma